American Idiot is a 2004 album by Green Day.

American Idiot may also refer to:

"American Idiot" (song), a song from the album
American Idiot (musical), a musical based on the album
American Idiot: The Original Broadway Cast Recording, the cast recording of the musical